Miguel Ángel Niño Corredor (born 25 January 1971) is a Colombian former professional road cyclist.

His brothers Libardo and Víctor also competed as professional cyclists.

Major results

1996
 1st Points classification, Vuelta a Colombia
2008
 1st Overall Clasica del Meta
 3rd Overall Clásica Aguazul
2011
 1st Stage 5 Tour of Azerbaijan (Iran)
 6th Overall International Presidency Tour
1st Stage 3

External links
 

1971 births
Living people
People from Paipa
Colombian male cyclists
Tour of Azerbaijan (Iran) winners
Sportspeople from Boyacá Department
21st-century Colombian people